Little Engine Productions (formerly Roundtable Entertainment) is a Los Angeles-based production company started by Gina Matthews in 1998.

History 
The origin of Little Engine Productions dates back to 1998 when Matthews, the former head of Tavel Entertaintment's literary and feature department, started Roundtable Entertainment. In 2007, Matthews and co-founder Grant Scharbo rebranded Roundtable Entertainment as Little Engine Productions.

The company's first feature film was 1998's Urban Legend, written by Silvio Horta. Other film producing credits include What Women Want, 13 Going on 30, and Isn’t It Romantic.

The company's first television series, Popular, premiered on The WB in 1999. The teen comedy-drama starred Leslie Bibb and Carly Pope and was co-created by Matthews and Ryan Murphy. The show was named one of the "26 Best Cult TV Shows Ever" by Entertainment Weekly. 

The team reunited with Horta in 2001 for SyFy's The Chronicle, and again in 2002 for UPN's Jake 2.0. Signing deals to produce TV shows for Viacom Productions in 2002, 20th Century Fox Television in 2005 and ITV Studios in 2016, the company’s television credits during this period include The Gates, Missing, Rush, and Saints & Strangers.

Filmography

Feature films

1990s

2000s

2010s

Television movies/pilots

1990s

2000s

Television series

1990s

2000s

2010s

References 

Entertainment companies based in California
Film production companies of the United States
Television production companies of the United States
Entertainment companies established in 1998
Companies based in Los Angeles